Anton Dimitrov may refer to:

 Anton Dimitrov (footballer, born 1979), Bulgarian football defender
 Anton Dimitrov (footballer, born 1970), Bulgarian football striker